Buddy Bears are painted, life-size fiberglass bear sculptures developed by German businesspeople Klaus and Eva Herlitz, in cooperation with  sculptor Roman Strobl. They have become a landmark of Berlin and are considered unofficial ambassadors of Germany. The outstretched arms of the standing Buddy Bear symbolise friendliness and optimism. The first bears were displayed at an artistic event in Berlin in 2001.

Buddy Bear Berlin Show 

The first activities were presented as the Buddy Bear Berlin Show. In 2001, artists painted approximately 350 bears to appear as decorative elements in the streets of Berlin. Four different bear designs (one standing on all four paws, one standing on two legs, one standing on its head, and one in a sitting position) were placed in the historic center of Berlin. Afterwards, many of the bears were sold at auctions in aid of local child relief nonprofits. Nowadays, these Berlin Buddy Bears are exclusively presented on private premises, in front of hotels and embassies, as well as in the foyers of various office buildings. There have been exhibitions of the original Buddy Bears  — designed by local artists — in the cities of Shanghai (2004), Buenos Aires (2005), and St. Gallen / Switzerland (2006).

United Buddy Bears  

United Buddy Bears is an international art exhibition with more than 140 -tall fiberglass bears. Under the motto: "We have to get to know each other better, it makes us understand one another better, trust each other more, and live together more peacefully", more than 140 countries acknowledged by the United Nations are represented, promoting  "tolerance, international understanding and the great concept of different nations and cultures living in peace and harmony". The bears stand "hand in hand" in a "peaceful circle" (The Art of Tolerance). The bears were on display between June and November 2002, in a circle around the Brandenburg Gate. Around 1.5 million people visited this first exhibition. On 6 November 2002, the bears were moved to new locations, including their respective countries' embassies in Berlin, or back to the country that they were based on. Some of the bears were auctioned off to raise money for UNICEF.

After the success of the first exhibition, a new circle was created in 2003. The idea was to send the circle on a global tour. The circle changes when it reaches a new city, as the bears are always set up in alphabetic order, following the local language of the host country. Entry to the exhibitions is always free. In every metropolis, the United Buddy Bears exhibitions are supported by the government, the foreign ministries, the mayors, local nonprofits, and UNICEF. The bears have been displayed at the following locations since the beginning of the tour:

Highlights
2003 Berlin: Having visited the exhibition in Berlin in 2002, Sir Peter Ustinov insisted that Iraq should be represented in the circle of United Buddy Bears in the future. In 2003, Iraq took part in the circle for the first time and Ustinov gave the opening address of the exhibition in the presence of more than 70 ambassadors.
2004 Hong Kong: Jackie Chan saw the exhibition in Berlin in 2003. On his initiative, the international bears travelled to Hong Kong one year later. Chan became the patron for this event. More than 3,000 VIPs from the world of politics, business and culture took part in the opening ceremony.
2005 Seoul: In the run-up to the exhibition in South Korea, two artists got the permission to travel from North Korea to Germany via Beijing in order to design a United Buddy Bear in Berlin on behalf of their country. Hence it was possible that both North- and South Korea stood together hand in hand for the first time during an art exhibition.
2007 Jerusalem: All countries of the Arab World were represented in the circle of 132 nations, with a Palestinian bear on an equal footing with all the other bears for the first time in Jerusalem.
2008 Pyongyang: It was the first exhibition in North Korea that was accessible for everyone and open to everybody. According to official information, around 100,000 visitors were counted every week in Pyongyang.
2012 Paris: United Buddy Bears are on show near the Eiffel Tower to celebrate the 25th anniversary of the twinning of Paris and Berlin and the 50th anniversary of the Élysée Treaty which marked the official reconciliation between France and Germany after world war two.
2014 Rio de Janeiro: From May till July the famous United Buddy Bears exhibit has found its way to the shores of Rio de Janeiro just in time for the 2014 soccer World Cup. The exhibition was held on the Copacabana promenade, which attracted more than 1,000,000 people. The presentation consisted of more than 140 bear sculptures, each  in height and designed by a different artist.
2015 Havana: "Germany sends peace message through sculptures in Cuba".  124 bears are standing "hand in hand" on the square "Plaza San Francisco de Asis". They were designed by 124 artists and represent 124 countries. All these countries – large or small, poor or rich – are placed together at the same level, including the US and Cuba! All these countries are reaching out – for tolerance, peace and democracy.

The Minis
In the autumn of 2003, the circle of United Buddy Bears-The Minis  — was presented in Berlin for the first time. Since then, this circle has been shown in Frankfurt/Main, in Potsdam and at the Sony Center in Berlin, as well as destinations outside of Germany, including Bratislava in Slovakia, Calais in France, and Yekaterinburg and Kazan in Russia.

Aid for children in need
, donations and proceeds from the sale of Buddy Bears at auction had generated a total of Euro 2,300,000 in support of UNICEF and local nonprofits that help children in need.

Involved artists
In the early years, the Bears were designed by regional artists and Berlin celebrities for the exhibition Art in the City. From 2002 onwards, thanks to support from Lufthansa, Air Berlin and the Berlin Hotel Association, artists from all five continents took part in the international project United Buddy Bears. More than 240 artists from over 150 countries have taken part in this project to date, such as, for example Arik Brauer, René Cadena Ayala, Hernando León, Ibrahim Hazimeh, Carlos Páez Vilaró, Seo Soo-Kyoung, Helge Leiberg, Leda Luss Luyken, Ludmila Seefried-Matějková – this is also echoed by the artist and UNICEF Australian National Ambassador, Ken Done.

Publications 
 Herlitz, Eva & Klaus, Buddy Bear Berlin Show. NeptunArt Publisher, 2001. .
 Herlitz, Eva & Klaus, United Buddy Bears — Die Kunst der Toleranz. Bostelmann & Siebenhaar Publishers, 2003. .
 Herlitz, Eva & Klaus, United Buddy Bears — World Tour. NeptunArt Publisher, 2006. .
 Herlitz, Eva & Klaus, United Buddy Bears — The Art of Tolerance. 384 pages, English/German, December 2009, .
 Herlitz, Eva & Klaus, Buddy Bear Berlin. 4th edition, December 2015, .
 Herlitz, Eva & Klaus, United Buddy Bears — The Art of Tolerance on World Tour. 288 pages, English/German, November 2017, .
 Jian-Min Huang: Public Art as Festival. Hong Kong 2005,  (Pages 63–111: Buddy Bears; Chinese/English).

References

External links
 
  
 Classic Buddy Bears home page
 The Golden Buddy Bears
 Jackie Chan and the United Buddy Bears
 United Buddy Bears: in Hong Kong, in Sydney, in Cairo, in Jerusalem, in Seoul
 Buddy Bears in: Bern, Switzerland, Shanghai, St.Gallen, Switzerland

2001 sculptures
21st-century sculptures
Animal sculptures in Germany
Art exhibitions in Germany
Sculptures of bears
Bears in popular culture
Contemporary works of art
Culture in Berlin
Fiberglass sculptures
Fictional bears
German sculpture
Modern art
Outdoor sculptures
Outdoor sculptures in Germany
Painted statue public art
Public art in Germany
Sculpture series
Sculptures in Germany